Terre-de-Haut is a commune in the French overseas department of Guadeloupe, including Terre-de-Haut Island and a few other small uninhabited islands of the archipelago (les Roches Percées; Îlet à Cabrit; Grand-Îlet; la Redonde). It is the most populous island of the archipelago of Les Saintes.  The Fort Napoléon is located in this commune.

Tourism
Terre-de-Haut is the most tourist-friendly municipality in les Saintes archipelago, with hotels, bungalows, bars and restaurants. There is little formalized activity, but one can tour the restored Fort Napoleon or rent mopeds. Located there is the beautiful Plage de Pompierre beach, as well as small guest-houses, eateries, French-Creole shops, and an active harbour where ferries passengers from Guadeloupe arrive. The local people make a living from fishing and from tourism. Visitors are free to explore without modern-day intrusion. The local currency is the Euro, but credit cards are easily accepted.
A small airport was built on the island in 1973 to welcome private planes from Guadeloupe and other nearby Caribbean islands.

History

Demographics

Points of interest
 Fort Napoléon des Saintes
 Jardin exotique du Fort Napoléon

Education
Public preschools and primary schools:
 Ecole primaire Bourg Terre-de-Haut
 Ecole maternelle Bourg Terre-de-Haut

See also
Communes of the Guadeloupe department

References

External links

  omtlessaintes.fr Tourist Office website
  terredehaut-lessaintes.com Official site of the mayor of Terre-de-Haut

Communes of Îles des Saintes
Communes of Guadeloupe